Many vessels named Ganges, after the Ganges river in India, have served the British East India Company (EIC) between the 17th and 19th centuries. 

 , sloop of the Bengal Pilot Service
 , sloop of the Bengal Pilot Service
 , an East Indiaman that made six voyages for the EIC and that was sold for breaking up in 1795 but before being broken up she served as a transport on Rear-Admiral Sir Hugh Cloberry Christian's expedition to the West Indies (1795-96).
 , brig launched at Bombay Dockyard in 1794 for the Bengal Pilot service and destroyed by fire in 1797 or 1799
 , an East Indiaman that participated in the Battle of Pulo Aura and that was wrecked off the Cape on 29 May 1807
 , an armed brig that also participated in the Battle of Pulo Aura

See also 
 Ganges (disambiguation) for other vessels
 
  for vessels named Ganges that served the British Royal Navy

References
Hackman, Rowan (2001) Ships of the East India Company. (Gravesend, Kent: World Ship Society). 
House of Commons, Parliament, Great Britain (1814), Minutes of the Evidence Taken Before the Select Committee on Petitions Relating to East-India-Built Shipping. (H.M. Stationery Office)